Stephen Lane may refer to:

 Stephen K. Lane (1833–1896), mayor of Bayonne, New Jersey 
 Stephen T. Lane, bishop of the Episcopal Diocese of Maine

See also
 Arthur Stephen Lane (1910–1997), United States federal judge
 Steven Lane